Lannepax is a commune in the Gers department in southwestern France. It is the site of a distillery of Armagnac brandy.

Geography
The Auzoue forms most of the commune's eastern border.

Population

See also
Communes of the Gers department

References

Communes of Gers